Bajirao I (Bajirao Ballal; ;18 August 1700 – 28 April 1740), born as Visaji, was the 7th Peshwa of the Maratha Confederacy. During his 20-year tenure as a Peshwa, he defeated  Nizam-ul-Mulk at several battles like the Battle of Palkhed and Battle of Bhopal. Bajirao contributed to  Maratha supremacy in southern India and northern India. Thus, he was partly responsible for establishing Maratha power in Gujarat, Malwa, Rajputana and Bundelkhand and liberating Konkan (in the western coast of India) from the Siddis of Janjira and Portuguese rule.

Baji Rao's relationship with his Muslim wife, a controversial subject, has been adapted in Indian novels and cinema.

Early life

Baji Rao was born into the Bhat Family in Sinnar, near Nashik. His biological father was Balaji Vishwanath the Peshwa of Shahu Maharaj I and his mother was Radhabai Barve. Baji Rao had a younger brother, Chimaji Appa, and two younger sisters, Anubai and Bhiubai. Anubai was married to Venkatrao Ghorpade of Ichalkaranji and Bhiubai was married to Abaji Naik Joshi of Baramati.

Baji Rao spent his childhood in his father's newly acquired fiefdom of Saswad. He and Chimaji were very close. Baji Rao was inspired by the lives of Shivaji Maharaj, Ramchandra Pant Amatya and Santaji Ghorpade.

Being born in a Brahmin family, his education included reading, writing and learning Sanskrit however, he did not remain confined to his books. Baji Rao displayed a passion for the military at an early age and often accompanied his father on military campaigns. He was with his father when his father was imprisoned by Damaji Thorat before being released for a ransom. Baji Rao had been on the expedition to Delhi in 1719 with his father and was convinced that the Mughal Empire was disintegrating and unable to resist northward Maratha expansion. When Balaji Vishwanath died in 1720, Shahu Maharaj appointed the 20-year-old Baji Rao as Peshwa despite opposition from other chieftains.

Personal life

Baji Rao's first wife was Kashibai, the daughter of Mahadji Krishna Joshi and Bhawanibai of Chas (a wealthy banking family). Baji Rao always treated his wife Kashibai with love and respect. Their relationship was a healthy and happy .They loved each other. They had four sons Balaji Baji Rao (also called Nanasaheb), Ramchandra Rao, Raghunath Rao and Janardhan Rao, who died at an early age. Nanasaheb was appointed Peshwa by Shahu Maharaj in 1740, succeeding his father.

Baji Rao took Mastani as his wife, the daughter of Rajput king Chhatrasal, born from his Muslim concubine. The relationship was a political one, arranged to please Chhatrasal. There relation was not out of love. Mastani had a son, Krishna Rao, in 1734. Since his mother was Muslim, Hindu priests refused to conduct upanayana ceremony and he became known as Shamsher Bahadur. After the deaths of Baji Rao and Mastani in 1740, Kashibai raised six-year-old Shamsher Bahadur as her own. Shamsher received a portion of his father's dominion of Banda and Kalpi. In 1761, he and his army fought alongside the Peshwa in the Third Battle of Panipat between the Marathas and the Afghans. Wounded in the battle, Shamsher died several days later in Deeg.

Baji Rao moved his base of operations from Saswad to Pune in 1728, laying the foundation for the transformation of a kasba into a large city. He began the construction of Shaniwar Wada in 1730. It was completed in 1732, beginning the era of Peshwa control of the city.

Appointment as Peshwa
Baji Rao was appointed Peshwa, succeeding his father, by Shahu Maharaj on 17 April 1720. By the time of his appointment, the Mughal emperor Muhammad Shah had upheld Maratha claims to the territories held by Chhatrapati Shivaji Maharaj at his death. A treaty gave the Marathas the right to collect taxes (chauth) in the Deccan's six provinces. Baji Rao convinced Shahu Maharaj that the Maratha Empire had to go on the offensive against its enemies to defend itself. He believed that the Mughal Empire was in decline, and wanted to take advantage of the situation with aggressive expansion into North India. Baji Rao compared the Mughals' declining fortune to a tree which, if attacked at its roots, would collapse. He is reported to have said:

As a new Peshwa, however, he faced several challenges. His appointment at a young age had evoked jealousy from senior officials such as Naro Ram Mantri, Anant Ram Sumant, Shripatrao Pant Pratinidhi, Khanderao Dabhade and Kanhoji Bhosle. Baji Rao promoted young men like himself, such as Malhar Rao Holkar, Ranoji Shinde, the Pawar brothers and Fateh Singh Bhosle, as commanders; these men did not belong to families who were hereditary Deshmukhs in the Deccan sultanates. Also the Purandare family who were the close associates of the Bhat Peshwa family, largely contributed in Baji Rao's success.

The Mughal viceroy of the Deccan, Nizam-ul-Mulk Asaf Jah I, had created a de facto autonomous kingdom in the region. He challenged Shahu Maharaj's right to collect taxes on the pretext that he did not know whether Shahu Maharaj or his cousin, Sambhaji Maharaj II of Kolhapur, was the rightful heir to the Maratha throne. The Marathas needed to assert their rights over the nobles of newly acquired territories in Malwa and Gujarat. Several nominally-Maratha areas were not actually under the Peshwa's control; for example, the Siddis controlled the Janjira fort.

Military conquests

The Nizam

On 4 January 1721, Baji Rao met Nizam-ul-Mulk Asaf Jah I at Chikhalthana to resolve their disputes. However, the Nizam refused to recognize the Maratha right to collect taxes from the Deccan provinces. He was made vizier of the Mughal Empire in 1721 by emperor Muhammad Shah, alarmed at his increasing power, transferred him from the Deccan to Awadh in 1723. The Nizam rebelled against the order, resigned as vizier and marched towards the Deccan. The emperor sent an army against him, which the Nizam defeated at the Battle of Sakhar-kheda; this forced the emperor to recognise him as viceroy of the Deccan. The Marathas, led by Baji Rao, helped the Nizam win this battle. For his valor, Baji Rao was honored with a robe, a 7,000-man mansabdari, an elephant, and a jewel. After the battle, the Nizam tried to appease the Maratha Chhatrapati Shahu Maharaj and the Mughal emperor; in reality, however, he wanted to carve out a sovereign kingdom and considered the Marathas his rivals in the Deccan.

In 1725, the Nizam sent an army to clear Maratha revenue collectors from the Carnatic region. The Marathas dispatched a force under Fateh Singh Bhosle to counter him; Baji Rao accompanied Bhosle, but did not command the army. The Marathas were forced to retreat; they launched a second campaign after the monsoon season, but again were unable to prevent the Nizam from ousting the Maratha collectors.

In the Deccan, Sambhaji Maharaj II of Kolhapur State had become a rival claimant to the title of Maratha King. The Nizam took advantage of the internal dispute, refusing to pay the chauth because it was unclear who was the real Chhatrapati (Shahu Maharaj or Sambhaji Maharaj II) and offering to arbitrate. Shripatrao Pant Pratinidhi advised Shahu Maharaj to begin negotiations and agree to arbitration. Sambhaji Maharaj II was supported by Chandrasen Jadhav, who had fought Baji Rao's father a decade earlier. Baji Rao convinced Shahu Maharaj to refuse the Nizam's offer and launch an assault.

The Nizam invaded Pune, where he installed Sambhaji Maharaj II as the King. He then marched out of the city, leaving behind a contingent headed by Fazal Beg. The Nizam plundered Loni, Pargaon, Patas, Supa and Baramati, using his artillery. On 27 August 1727, Baji Rao began a retaliatory guerilla attack on the Nizam with his trusted lieutenants Malhar Rao Holkar, Ranoji Shinde and the Pawar brothers. He began to destroy the towns held by the Nizam; leaving Pune, he crossed the Godavari River near Puntamba and plundered Jalna and Sindkhed. Baji Rao destroyed Berar, Mahur, Mangrulpir and Washim before turning north-west to Khandesh. He crossed the Tapi River at Kokarmunda and entered eastern Gujarat, reaching Chota Udaipur in January 1728. After hearing that the Nizam had returned to Pune, Baji Rao feinted toward Burhanpur; he thought that after hearing about the threat to the strategically-important Burhanpur, the Nizam would try to save it. Baji Rao did not enter Burhanpur, however, arriving at Betawad in Khandesh on 14 February 1728. When the Nizam heard that his northern territories had been devastated by Baji Rao, he left Pune and marched towards the Godavari to meet Baji Rao on an open plain where his artillery would be effective. The Nizam was quickly surrounded by Maratha forces and trapped, his lines of supply and communication were cut. He was forced to make peace; he signed the Treaty of Mungi Shevgaon on 6 March, recognising Shahu Maharaj as the King and the Maratha right to collect taxes in the Deccan.

This battle is considered as an example of brilliant execution of military strategy.
In his Military History of India, Jadunath Sarkar wrote:
"This campaign gives a classic example of what the predatory horse, when led by a genius, could achieve in the age of light artillery."

Malwa 

In 1723, Baji Rao organised an expedition to southern Malwa. Maratha chiefs, including Ranoji Shinde, Malhar Rao Holkar, Udaji Rao Pawar, Tukoji Rao Pawar and Jivaji Rao Pawar, had collected chauth from several parts of the province. (Later, these chiefs carved out their own kingdoms: Gwalior, Indore, Dhar and Dewas State – Junior and Senior, respectively). To counter Maratha influence, the Mughal emperor had appointed Girdhar Bahadur governor of Malwa.

After defeating the Nizam, Baji Rao again turned his attention to Malwa. He consigned a large army in October 1728 to his younger brother, Chimaji Appa, and aided by his trusted generals Udaji Pawar and Malhar Rao Holkar. The Maratha force reached the southern bank of the Narmada River on 24 November 1728. The following day, they crossed the river and encamped near Dharampuri. Marching rapidly northwards, they crossed the ghat near Mandu and halted at Nalchha on 27 November. The Mughal forces, led by Girdhar Bahadur and his cousin Daya Bahadur, hastily prepared to oppose them on hearing that the Maratha army had begun to climb the ghats. Girdhar Bahadur believed that the Marathas, thinking that the pass near the Mandu fort was well guarded, would climb the ghat near Amjhera; he and his army marched to Amjhera and took up a strong position there. Since the Marathas did not appear there, he suspected that they climbed near the Mandu fort and set out for Dhar on 29 November 1728. Girdhar Bahadur found Maratha horsemen coming towards him. In the 29 November Battle of Amjhera, Chimaji's army defeated the Mughals; Girdhar Bahadur and Daya Bahadur were killed. The Mughal forces fled, and their camp was plundered; eighteen elephants, horses, drums and other loot were taken by the Marathas. News of the victory reached the ears of Peshwa, who was visiting Chhatrasal. Chimaji marched towards Ujjain, but had to retreat due to lack of supplies. By February 1729, Maratha forces had reached present-day Rajasthan.

Bundelkhand 

In Bundelkhand, Chhatrasal rebelled against the Mughal Empire and established an independent kingdom. In December 1728, a Mughal force led by Muhammad Khan Bangash attacked him and besieged his fort and family. Although Chhatrasal repeatedly sought Baji Rao's assistance, he was busy in Malwa at the time. He compared his dire situation to that of Gajendra Moksha. In his letter to Baji Rao, Chhatrasal wrote the following words:
 In March 1729, the Peshwa responded to Chhatrasal's request and marched towards Bundelkhand with 25,000 horsemen and his lieutenants Pilaji Jadhav, Tukoji Pawar, Naro Shankar, and Davalji Somwanshi. Chhatrasal escaped capture and joined the Maratha force, increasing it to 70,000 men. After marching to Jaitpur, Baji Rao's forces surrounded Bangash and cut his supply and communication lines. Bangash launched a counterattack against Baji Rao, but could not pierce his defences. Qaim Khan, son of Muhammad Khan Bangash, learned of his father's predicament and approached with fresh troops. His army was attacked by Baji Rao's forces, and he was defeated. Bangash was later forced to leave, signing an agreement that "he would never attack Bundelkhand again". Chhatrasal's position as ruler of Bundelkhand was restored. He granted a large jagir to Baji Rao, and gave him his daughter Mastani. Before Chhatrasal's death in December 1731, he ceded one-third of his territories to the Marathas.

Gujarat

After consolidating Maratha influence in central India, Baji Rao decided to assert the Maratha right to collect taxes from the wealthy province of Gujarat and sent a Maratha force under Chimaji Appa there in 1730. Sarbuland Khan, the province's Mughal governor, ceded the right to collect chauth to the Marathas. He was soon replaced by Abhay Singh, who also recognized the Maratha right to collect taxes. This irked  Shahu's senapati (commander-in-chief), Trimbak Rao Dabhade, whose ancestors had raided Gujarat several times and asserted their right to collect taxes from the province. Annoyed at Baji Rao's control of what he considered his family's sphere of influence, he rebelled against the Peshwa. Two other Maratha nobles from Gujarat, Damaji Rao Gaekwad and Kadam Bande, also sided with Dabhade.

After Girdhar Bahadur's defeat in 1728, the Mughal emperor had appointed Jai Singh II to subdue the Marathas. Jai Singh recommended a peaceful agreement; the emperor disagreed, replacing him with Muhammad Khan Bangash. Bangash formed an alliance with the Nizam, Trimbak Rao and Sambhaji Maharaj II. Baji Rao learned that Dabhade and Gaikwad had made preparations for an open fight on the plain of Dabhoi with a force of 40 thousand, while Baji Rao's numbers hardly reached 25 thousand in all. Baji Rao repeatedly sent messages to Dabhade to solve the dispute amicably in the presence of Chatrapati Shahu Maharaj. But Dabhade was stiff and stubborn, disagreeing Baji Rao's proposition, therefore on 1 April 1731, Baji Rao struck at the allied forces of Dabhade, Gaekwad and Kadam Bande. The Dabhade was seated on elephant and Baji Rao was on horseback. But during the battle, a bullet pierced Trimbakrao's head and he died on the spot. Later it was discovered that the shot that killed Dabhade was fired by Dabhade's maternal uncle Bhau Singh Thoke. Baji Rao resolved the dispute with Sambhaji Maharaj II on 13 April by signing the Treaty of Warna, which demarcated the territories of Shahu Maharaj and Sambhaji Maharaj II. The Nizam met Baji Rao at Rohe-Rameshwar on 27 December 1732, and promised not to interfere with Maratha expeditions.

Shahu Maharaj and Baji Rao avoided a rivalry with the powerful Dabhade clan after subduing Trimbak Rao; Trimbak's son, Yashwant Rao, was appointed as Shahu Maharaj's senapati. The Dabhade clan were allowed to continue collecting chauth from Gujarat if they deposited half the revenue in Shahu Maharaj's treasury.

Siddis

The Siddis of Janjira controlled a small, strategically-important territory on India's west coast. Although they originally held only the Janjira fort, after Shivaji Maharaj's death they expanded their rule to a large part of central and northern Konkan. After the death of Siddi chief Yakut Khan in 1733, a war of succession broke out among his sons; one, Abdul Rehman, asked Baji Rao for help. Baji Rao sent a Maratha force led by Sekhoji Angre, son of Kanhoji Angre. The Marathas regained control of several portions of Konkan, and besieged Janjira. Their strength was diverted after Peshwa's rival, Pant Pratinidhi, occupied Raigad Fort (near Janjira) in June 1733. Sekhoji Angre died in August (further weakening the Maratha position), and Baji Rao signed a peace treaty with the Siddis. He allowed the Siddis to retain control of Janjira if they accepted Abdul Rehman as the ruler; they were also allowed to retain control of Anjanvel, Gowalkot and Underi. The Marathas retained Raigad, Rewas, Thal and Chaul.

The Siddis launched an offensive to regain their lost territories soon after the Peshwa returned to Satara, then Baji Rao dispatched a force to prevent them from taking over Raigad Fort in June 1734. Chimnaji made a surprise attack on a Siddi camp near Rewas on 19 April 1736, killing about 1,500 (including their leader, Siddi Sat). in June 1736, Baji Rao dispatched a force under Yesaji Gaikwad, Dhanaji Thorat and Sidoji Barge to gain the control territories like Gowalkot. On 25 September of that year, the Siddis signed a peace treaty which confined them to Janjira, Gowalkot and Anjanvel.

Rajputana 
With Shahu Maharaj's consent, Baji Rao began a northward journey on 9 October 1735. Accompanied by his wife, Kashibai, he intended to visit Rajput courts and persuade them to pay chauth. Baji Rao arrived at Mewar's southern frontier in January 1736, where Rana Jagat Singh II had made arrangements for his visit.

Diplomatic talks got underway. Baji Rao also visited Jagmandir Palace, in the centre of Pichola Lake (at Rana Jagat Singh's invitation), and Nath-Dwara. After resolving matters in Mewar, Baji Rao advanced towards Jaipur. Jai Singh hastened south with his forces, and they met in Bhambholao (near Kishangarh).

Their meeting lasted for several days, with talks about chauth and the cession of Malwa from the Mughal Emperor. Baji Rao then returned to the Deccan. The emperor did not agree to his demands, however, and he planned to march on Delhi to force him to agree.

March to Delhi

After the death of Trimbak Rao, Bangash's alliance against the Marathas fell apart. The Mughal emperor recalled him from Malwa, and re-appointed Jai Singh II as governor of Malwa. However, the Maratha chief Holkar defeated Jai Singh in the 1733 Battle of Mandsaur. After two more battles, the Mughals decided to offer the Marathas the right to collect the equivalent of 22 lakh in chauth from Malwa. On 4 March 1736, Baji Rao and Jai Singh reached an agreement at Kishangad. Jai Singh convinced the emperor to agree to the plan, and Baji Rao was appointed deputy governor of the region. Jai Singh is believed to have secretly informed Baji Rao that it was a good time to subdue the weakening Mughal emperor.

The Peshwa began to march on the Mughal capital, Delhi, from Pune on 12 November 1736 with a force of 50,000 cavalry troops. Learning of the advancing Maratha army, the Mughal emperor asked Saadat Ali Khan I to march from Agra and check the advance. The Maratha chiefs Malhar Rao Holkar, Vithoji Bule and Pilaji Jadhav crossed Yamuna and plundered the Mughal territories in the Doab. Saadat Khan led a force of 150,000, defeated them, and retired to Mathura. Malhar Rao Holkar rejoined Baji Rao's army near Gwalior. Samsam-ud-Daulah, Mir Bakshi and Muhammad Khan Bangash invited Saadat Ali Khan to a banquet in Samsam-ud-Daulah's tent in Mathura, thinking that the Marathas had retreated to the Deccan. During the feast, they learnt that Baji Rao had slipped along the Jat and Mewati hill route (avoiding the direct Agra-Delhi route) and was at Delhi. The Mughal commanders left the feast and began a hasty return to capital. The Mughal emperor dispatched a force, led by Mir Hasan Khan Koka, to check Baji Rao's advance. The Marathas defeated his force in the 28 March 1737 Battle of Delhi. Baji Rao then retreated from the capital, concerned about the approach of a larger Mughal force from Mathura.

Baji Rao's dash on Delhi was executed with such daring and audacity that neither the Mughal generals nor the Mughal intelligence could comprehend or predict his moves.

Battle of Bhopal

Mughal emperor Muhammad Shah sought help from the Nizam after Baji Rao's march to Delhi; the Nizam set out from the Deccan, met Baji Rao's returning force at Sironj, and told the Peshwa that he was going to Delhi to repair his relationship with the Mughal emperor. The Nizam was joined by other Mughal chiefs, and a 30,000-man Mughal army (reinforced by artillery), was dispatched against Baji Rao. The Peshwa assembled an 80,000-man force. To counter aid to the Nizam from the Deccan, Baji Rao stationed a force of 10,000 (under Chimaji Appa) on the Tapti River with instructions to prevent Nasir Jung from advancing beyond Burhanpur. He and his forces crossed the Narmada in early December 1737, communicating with agents and spies posted to observe enemy moves. The Nizam sheltered in Bhopal, a fortified town with a lake at his rear, to keep his army and artillery secure.

Baji Rao besieged the Nizam, cutting off outside provisions. Because of the Nizam's artillery, the Marathas kept their distance and harassed their lines; no food could come in from outside, and the men and their animals were starving. The Nizam, unable to hold out any longer, signed a peace agreement at Doraha on 7 January 1738. Malwa was ceded to the Marathas; the Mughals agreed to pay the equivalent of 5,000,000 in reparations, with the Nizam swearing on the Quran to abide by the treaty.

The Portuguese 

The Portuguese had colonised several regions of India's west coast. They violated an agreement to give the Marathas a site on Salsette Island for a factory, and were intolerant of Hindus in their territory. In March 1737, the Peshwa dispatched a Maratha force (led by Chimaji) against them. Although the Marathas captured Ghodbunder Fort and nearly all of Vasai in the Battle of Vasai and gained control of Salsette on 16 May 1739 after a long siege, Nader Shah's invasion of India then diverted their attention from the Portuguese. The war trophies from Vasai included several Church bells which are found in many prominent Hindu temples in Maharashtra.

Battle tactics and character

Baji Rao was known for rapid tactical movements in battle, using cavalry inherited from Maratha generals such as Santaji Ghorpade and Dhanaji Jadhav. Two examples are the Battle of Palkhed in 1728, when he outmaneuvered the Mughal governor of the Deccan, and in the battle at Delhi in 1737. His skill was in moving large numbers of cavalry at a great speed. British field marshal Bernard Montgomery studied Baji Rao's tactics in the Palkhed campaign, particularly his rapid movements and his troops' ability to live off the land (with little concern about supply and communication lines) while conducting "maneuver warfare" against the enemy. In his book, A Concise History of Warfare, Montgomery wrote the following about Baji Rao's victory at Palkhed:

Montgomery further wrote,

Baji Rao used local terrain to cut enemy supply lines. Leading from the front, he used the traditional Maratha tactics of encircling the enemy quickly, appearing from the rear, attacking from an unexpected direction, distracting the enemy's attention, keeping them off-balance, and defining the battlefield on his own terms. Baji Rao kept detailed information about enemy forces to himself, attacking where least expected and thus inspiring fear.

Baji Rao is considered one of  celebrated personality  in the history of Maratha Empire by many historians. 

In his introduction to Baji Rao I: The Great Peshwa, K. M. Panikkar wrote:

He is also considered to be one of the greatest military generals of his time.
Jadunath Sarkar called Baji Rao, "a heavenly-born cavalry leader". Also describing his twenty years military career, Jadunath Sarkar wrote:

Chatrapati Shahu Maharaj also had an implicit faith on Baji Rao. He had issued orders that, "all should obey Baji Rao faithfully and should do nothing to offend his temper". On the other occasion he has called Baji Rao as "the man with iron nerves".

Death

Baji Rao's body was exhausted due to ceaseless wars and military campaigns. He caught a virulent fever while being encamped in Raverkhedi and died on 28 April 1740. He was cremated the same day on the bank of Narmada River. Balaji Baji Rao ordered Ranoji Shinde to build a chhatri as a memorial. The memorial is enclosed by a dharmashala. The compound has two temples, dedicated to Nilkantheshwar Mahadev (Shiva) and Rameshwar (Rama).

In popular culture 
Character of Bajirao is portrayed in Marathi audio web series ‘Shrimant Kashibai Bajirao Peshwe’ created by Cultural Legacy of India.
Bajirao Mastani, a 1925 Indian silent film about the Peshwa directed by Nanubhai B. Desai and Bhalji Pendharkar.
Rau, a 1972 fictional Marathi novel by Nagnath S. Inamdar, featured a love story of Baji Rao I and Mastani.
 Mastani, 1955 film directed by Dhirubhai Desai. It starred Nigar Sultana, Manher Desai, Shahu Modak and Agha.
The 2015 historical drama film Bajirao Mastani, directed by Sanjay Leela Bhansali, starred Ranveer Singh as Baji Rao I.
 Shrimant Peshwa Bajirao Mastani, another Indian TV series broadcast on ETV Marathi in 2015.
 Peshwa Bajirao, a 2017 TV series starring Rudra Soni as young Baji Rao and Karan Suchak as the adult Baji Rao, aired on Sony TV.

See also
 Maratha rulers

References

Further reading

External links 

 Shaniwar Wada – the Peshwa palace at Pune 

Peshwa dynasty
Marathi people
1700 births
1740 deaths
Hindu monarchs
Indian generals